Homecoming is Craig's Brother's first full-length album, released on May 19, 1998 through Tooth & Nail Records.

Track listing

References

1998 debut albums
Craig's Brother albums
Tooth & Nail Records albums